Peppa Pig is a British preschool animated television series produced by Astley Baker Davies. The show features the eponymous pig along with her family and friends. Each episode is approximately five minutes long (with the exception of a 10-minute special and two 15-minute specials). There have been seven seasons as of 2021. The seventh season began airing on 5 March 2021, and finished airing on 30 November 2021. Peppa Pig has been broadcast in over 180 countries. As of 21 September 2022, 374 episodes of Peppa Pig have aired.

Series overview

Episodes
The following tables list with details the episodes for the children's television programme Peppa Pig, which were first broadcast in the UK on Channel 5 and Nick Jr., starting in 2004. Each episode is approximately five minutes long, except for a 10-minute "Special" ("Peppa's Christmas") and two 15-minute "Specials" ("The Golden Boots") and ("Around The World with Peppa"). This list also includes upcoming episodes.

The "DVD reference" column in the episode lists is used to relate an episode to the DVD volume(s) on which it can be found (e.g. episode 10 in series 1 "Gardening" has a DVD reference of 1.09, which indicates that the episode is track 9 on primary DVD volume 1). A prefix of "NP" (e.g. NP1.01) indicates the episode is the first episode on "Non-Primary" DVD 1.

Series 1 (2004)

Series 2 (2006–07)

Christmas special (2007)

Series 3 (2009–10)

Series 4 (2011–12)

Specials (2015–16)

Series 5 (2016–18)

Film (2017)

Series 6 (2019–20)

Series 7 (2021–23)

Peppa Pig Tales (2022–present)
These episodes aired on YouTube every weekend.

DVD and VHS releases

New UK DVD releases
The following tables list the new DVD releases for the UK. When applicable, the list includes DVDs that are known to be due for release soon. All UK DVD releases are in 16:9 widescreen format.

"Primary" DVDs
A "Primary DVD" is defined as a DVD that includes at least one episode not previously released on DVD.

Note that in the "list of episodes"
(a) "DVD#" (DVD number) identifies the track number for the episode on the DVD, but is given in a form that is consistent in form with the "DVD reference" in the episode lists (e.g. the episode "Gardening" has a DVD# of 1.09, which is primary DVD Volume 1, episode 9)
(b) "Episode#" (Episode number) identifies the series, and the episode number within the series, of the episode (e.g. "Gardening" has an Episode# of 1.10, which identifies it as Series 1, episode 10).

Except as indicated below, all the episodes on a primary DVD are "new to DVD" when the DVD was released.
(a) 10 "regular" episodes, plus the "Peppa's Christmas" special episode (which was a "new to DVD" episode on Volume 7, but not on Volume 9).
(b) No formally assigned volume number, but treated as a "primary" DVD as it contains the first release to DVD of a new Peppa Pig episode ("The Queen"), and the DVDs containing episodes not previously released that were issued immediately before and after this DVD have been given volume references of 16 and 18 respectively. As well as the "Queen" episode, the DVD has 9 other Peppa Pig episodes, which have all been released on earlier Peppa Pig primary DVDs, and two episodes from Ben and Holly's Little Kingdom, which are also on previously released DVDs.
(c) 10 episodes - 9 "regular" episodes plus the "Peppa's Christmas" special episode. Only one of the episodes is new to DVD ("Snowy Mountain"), all the other episodes on the DVD including the special have all been released on earlier Peppa Pig primary DVDs.
(d) As per Amazon UK. There are four episodes on the DVD - "The Golden Boots" special episode, plus 3 "regular" episodes. All the episodes are new to DVD.
(e) All the Peppa Pig episodes new to DVD, but 'Pumpkin Party' was not transmitted in the UK until after the DVD release date.
(f) Some versions of the DVD place "Washing" first, and "The Fire Engine" fourth.
(g) Contains the episodes as seen in the cinema, with title sequences, but without closing credits.
(h) Contains the episodes as seen in the cinema, with title sequences (all bar "Muddy Festival"), but without closing credits (all).

"Non-Primary" DVDs
These are new DVD releases where the DVD includes only episodes that have already been released to DVD (i.e. it is not a "Primary" DVD). The episodes in these DVDs are included in the DVD Reference field in the main table listings, but with a prefix of "NP" (="Non-Primary").

Other UK DVD releases
Most of the primary DVDs have been re-released, either singly or in combination, as follows

A free Peppa Pig DVD (containing the four episodes "Mummy Pig at Work", "Frogs and Worms and Butterflies", "Secrets" and "Muddy Puddles") was released by the Daily Mirror on 13 September 2006, as part of a children's DVD promotion.

UK VHS releases
A VHS tape ("Muddy Puddles") was released on 7 February 2005, a VHS tape ("Flying a Kite") was released on 4 July 2005 and a VHS tape ("New Shoes") was released on 7 November 2005 (i.e. the VHS tapes were released on the same dates as the corresponding primary DVDs). A promotional tape ("Polly Parrot") was also released around that time which contained 3 episodes (Polly Parrot, Bicycles and Snow).

Non-UK DVD releases
1. Volume 1: Muddy Puddles
Released in France as "Cache-Cache" ("Hide And Seek"), in 14:9 format with French-Language soundtrack, and the option to watch in English with French subtitles.
Released in the Netherlands as "Modderpoelen en Andere Verhaaltjes" ("Muddy Puddles and Other Stories"), in 4:3 format with Dutch-language soundtrack.
Released in Germany as "Matschepampe und Weitere Wutzige Geschichten" ("Muddy Puddles and other Piggy Stories"), in 4:3 format with German-language soundtrack, without the episodes "Camping" (1.08), "Bicycles" (1.10), "The New Car" (1.11) and "Snow" (1.12), but with "Picnic" (2.05) and "Piggy in the Middle" (4.01) for unknown reasons.
2. Volume 4
Released in France as "La cabane dans l’arbre (The Tree House)", with the episodes
 Grenouilles, vers et papillons (Frogs, Worms and Butterflies)
 La cabane dans l’arbre (The Tree House)
 Monsieur l’épouvantail (Mister Scarecrow)
 La mare aux petits bateaux (The Boat Pond)
 Jour de brume (Foggy Day)
 Les petites bêtes (Tiny Creatures)
 Une promenade à vélo (The Cycle Ride)
 Le pique nique (Picnic)
 Les bulles (Bubbles)
 Vive le camping (School Camp)

Notes
The episode numbering is based on the original (UK) broadcast dates. The US and Australian air dates are only listed if an episode premiered in one of those countries first. 
The original broadcast dates for series 1 & 2 and the "special" were derived by an analysis across various data sources, in particular:
(a) the Radio Times listings (paper archive)
(b) the Channel 5 episode list
(c) notes on TVThrong
(d) the MSN TV episode list and
(e) the Daily & Sunday Express newspaper archives.

References

External links
 
 Peppa Pig official website
 Peppa Pig at milkshake.tv
 Peppa Pig at nickjr.co.uk

Peppa Pig
Lists of British animated television series episodes
Lists of British children's television series episodes
Lists of British comedy television series episodes
Lists of Nickelodeon television series episodes